Kingscliff High School, sometimes referred to as Kingy High is a government-funded co-educational comprehensive secondary day school, located in Kingscliff, in the Northern Rivers region of New South Wales, Australia. 

Kingscliff High School established in 1986, located in the Far North Coast (1100 students, including 12% Aboriginal or Torres Strait Islander students) provides comprehensive, engaging and authentic opportunities to the young people of the Tweed Coast communities.  Our commitment is to inspire our students to become lifelong learners and aspirational citizens. As a learning community we seek to achieve this though a collective focus on creativity as the driver of innovation, through collaboration as an inclusive means of realising our potential, through confident communication of our ideas and values, and through ongoing critical reflection on the efficacy of our work together. The school is operated by the NSW Department of Education; the principal is Michael Hensley. 

Our school recognises the importance of student agency and voice in building genuine engagement in deep learning, and this has led to the growing profile of student leadership in our school. This, combined with our work in establishing pathways to community based learning opportunities reinforces our commitment to innovative approaches to teaching and learning.

Kingscliff High School benefits from dynamic and meaningful partnerships with our neighbouring primary schools through the Coastal Learning Community (CLC) and with our neighbouring public high schools as part of the Tweed 5 (T5) network.  In addition, we build strong connections with other schools across NSW and Australia who, like us, have formed an ongoing partnership with the 4C Transformative Learning Group and the Future Schools Alliance.

The school has close ties with the adjoining Kingscliff Institute of TAFE.

See also

 List of government schools in New South Wales
 List of schools in Northern Rivers and Mid North Coast
 Education in Australia

References

External links
 
 NSW Schools website

Public high schools in New South Wales
1986 establishments in Australia
Educational institutions established in 1986
Northern Rivers